Eli Review is a web-based service that provides instructors with tools to facilitate peer learning through the three primary activities in the writing process: writing, review, and revision. Its main theoretical basis is a concept associated with Lev Vygotsky known as the zone of proximal development, or instructional scaffolding, where learners build confidence and skill through working with a more capable peer and with the guidance of an experienced teacher or mentor. It was originally developed at Michigan State University, and functioned for several years in the MSU community before commercialisation in 2011.

Eli Review positions instructors as “review coordinators” where they design survey-like reviews that guide students in giving criteria-based feedback. This allows assignment and review of writing and revision tasks to be performed piecemeal, which enables students to develop work iteratively and focus more on higher-order concerns such as organization and pairing claims with suitable evidence, than surface-level issues such as grammar or spelling.  Engagement data is tracked for individual activities and automatically compiled into individual student and aggregate class reports.

Further reading

References 

 
 

Software for teachers